Mohammed El Alaoui (born 7 July 1974 in Tangiers) is the current Chamberlain of king Mohammed VI of Morocco. He is reportedly a very close friend of the monarch, in addition to being his distant Alaouite cousin.

Family
Mohammed El Alaoui is the son of Zine El Abidine El Alaoui and Lalla Oum Kalthum Alaoui.

His maternal grandfather (Prince Moulay El Hassan ben El Mehdi) was also the second husband of Princess Lalla Aicha, aunt of Mohammed VI and younger sister of Hassan II. His mother is reportedly very close to Princess Lalla Meryem.

Life and business activities

Mohammed El Alaoui was educated in the Lycée Regnault and got his Baccalauréat in 1993. He obtained in 1999 a Bachelor's degree in international trade from the university of Paris Assas. He is active in business in the real-estate and tourism sectors especially in the city of Tangiers.

References

1974 births
Living people
Moroccan princes
Advisors of Mohammed VI of Morocco
Moroccan businesspeople
Paris 2 Panthéon-Assas University alumni
People from Tangier